In Greek mythology, Pallas (/ˈpæləs/; Ancient Greek: Πάλλας) was a member of the Athenian royal family.

Family 
Pallas was one of the four sons of the exiled King Pandion II of Athens and Pylia, daughter of King Pylas of Megara. He was the brother of Aegeus, Nisos, Lykos and the wife of Sciron.

Mythology 
Upon the death of Pandion, Pallas and his brothers took control of Athens from Metion, who had seized the throne from Pandion. They divided the government in four but Aegeas became king. Pallas received Paralia or Diacria as his domain, or else he shared the power over several demes with Aegeus. Later, after the death of Aegeas, Pallas tried to take the throne from the rightful heir, his nephew, Theseus, but failed and was killed by him, and so were his fifty children, the Pallantides.

In a version endorsed by Servius, Pallas was not a brother, but a son of Aegeus, and thus a brother of Theseus, by whom he was expelled from Attica. He then came to Arcadia, where he became king and founded a dynasty to which Evander and another Pallas belonged.

Notes

References 

 Apollodorus, The Library with an English Translation by Sir James George Frazer, F.B.A., F.R.S. in 2 Volumes, Cambridge, MA, Harvard University Press; London, William Heinemann Ltd. 1921. ISBN 0-674-99135-4. Online version at the Perseus Digital Library. Greek text available from the same website.
 Gaius Julius Hyginus, Fabulae from The Myths of Hyginus translated and edited by Mary Grant. University of Kansas Publications in Humanistic Studies. Online version at the Topos Text Project.
 Lucius Mestrius Plutarchus, Lives with an English Translation by Bernadotte Perrin. Cambridge, MA. Harvard University Press. London. William Heinemann Ltd. 1914. 1. Online version at the Perseus Digital Library. Greek text available from the same website.
 Maurus Servius Honoratus, In Vergilii carmina comentarii. Servii Grammatici qui feruntur in Vergilii carmina commentarii; recensuerunt Georgius Thilo et Hermannus Hagen. Georgius Thilo. Leipzig. B. G. Teubner. 1881. Online version at the Perseus Digital Library.
 Pausanias, Description of Greece with an English Translation by W.H.S. Jones, Litt.D., and H.A. Ormerod, M.A., in 4 Volumes. Cambridge, MA, Harvard University Press; London, William Heinemann Ltd. 1918. . Online version at the Perseus Digital Library
 Pausanias, Graeciae Descriptio. 3 vols. Leipzig, Teubner. 1903.  Greek text available at the Perseus Digital Library.
 Stephanus of Byzantium, Stephani Byzantii Ethnicorum quae supersunt, edited by August Meineike (1790-1870), published 1849. A few entries from this important ancient handbook of place names have been translated by Brady Kiesling. Online version at the Topos Text Project.
 Strabo, The Geography of Strabo. Edition by H.L. Jones. Cambridge, Mass.: Harvard University Press; London: William Heinemann, Ltd. 1924. Online version at the Perseus Digital Library.
 Strabo, Geographica edited by A. Meineke. Leipzig: Teubner. 1877. Greek text available at the Perseus Digital Library.
 Suida, Suda Encyclopedia translated by Ross Scaife, David Whitehead, William Hutton, Catharine Roth, Jennifer Benedict, Gregory Hays, Malcolm Heath Sean M. Redmond, Nicholas Fincher, Patrick Rourke, Elizabeth Vandiver, Raphael Finkel, Frederick Williams, Carl Widstrand, Robert Dyer, Joseph L. Rife, Oliver Phillips and many others. Online version at the Topos Text Project.

Princes in Greek mythology
Ancient Megarians
Attican characters in Greek mythology
Ancient Megara
Arcadian mythology